Edgar Cedric Ball (11 January 1892 – 15 May 1969), was a former first-class cricketer who played three matches for Somerset County Cricket Club in 1914.  He was a left-handed batsman who also played eight Minor Counties Cricket Championship matches for Devon between 1909 and 1912.

Ball frequently opened the batting for Devon during his eight matches, and it was while doing this that he made his top-score for the county, making 78 against Surrey Second XI.  He played three matches for Somerset in the 1914 season, the only first-class matches of his career.  After batting at number three in the first two matches, Ball dropped down the order to number seven for the third, and made his highest first-class total of 20.

In 1932, having moved to Canada, Ball played in four matches against the touring Australians, playing a match each for Cowichan and Vancouver, before representing British Columbia in two matches.  In the last of the four matches, Donald Bradman made 171 for the tourists, surpassing the British Columbia first-innings total on his own.

References

External links
 
 

1892 births
1969 deaths
English cricketers
Somerset cricketers
People from Richmond, London
Devon cricketers
People educated at Clifton College